Patriarch Manuel of Constantinople may refer to:

 Manuel I of Constantinople, Ecumenical Patriarch in 1216–1222
 Manuel II of Constantinople, Ecumenical Patriarch in 1244–1255